Fractured Flickers is a  live-action syndicated half-hour television comedy show that was produced by Jay Ward, who is otherwise known for cartoons. The pilot film was produced in 1961 (hence the 1961 copyright notice on the animated main title), but the series was not completed until 1963. Twenty-six episodes were produced; they were syndicated by Desilu Productions and played for several years on local stations.

Content
Host Hans Conried introduced short "flickers" pieced together from silent film footage and from other older films, overdubbed with newly written comic dialogue, music, and sound effects. The voices for these were provided by fellow Ward mainstays Paul Frees, June Foray, and Bill Scott. The earliest episodes have careful dubbing, with the actors and writers taking pains to synchronize the new dialogue with the actors' lip movements. Once the series had deadlines to face, however, the time-consuming dubbing was abandoned, and the later episodes do not bother with exact synchronization.

True to the Jay Ward brand of humor, the dialogue was loaded with puns and one-line jokes. (One silent vignette was retitled "The Barber of Stanwyck", utilizing scenes from Douglas Fairbanks' 1920 silent classic, The Mark of Zorro.) Films, television, advertising, and even the Fractured Flickers series itself were fair game for merciless kidding. (Conried quipped, "This is what we'll be doing for the next several weeks--or until someone finds out!") The show was at its funniest when desecrating early melodramas with "hip" reinterpretations, such as presenting Rudolph Valentino as an insurance salesman or Lon Chaney, Sr.'s The Hunchback of Notre Dame as "Dinky Dunstan, Boy Cheerleader." (Lon Chaney, Jr. was not amused by the latter and attempted unsuccessfully to sue Jay Ward over it.)  Many segments were vicious satires of television commercials; a typical "word from our sponsor" would have the announcer extolling the virtues of the item being advertised, accompanied by darkly humorous clips. A fly-by-night real estate development, for example, was illustrated with clips of buildings being destroyed by a cyclone (from Steamboat Bill, Jr. with Buster Keaton). And "This moment of softness (explosions, wild parties, etc.) has been brought to you by Bee. Bee, the only tissue woven in mid-air by bees!" Regular features were the "Minute Mysteries", featuring Stan Laurel as master detective Sherman Oaks (his scenes "fractured" from his 1925 short comedy, Dr. Pyckle and Mr. Pryde), and the weekly "tributes" to some American city.

Each episode also featured a celebrity guest whom Conried would interview. Most were popular personalities of the 1960s such as Fabian, Bob Denver, Deborah Walley, Rod Serling, and Rose Marie. Many of them caught the spirit of the show, and answered Conried's questions with tongue in cheek.

Many prominent figures of the 1960s were lampooned. A segment based on the Kennedy family (and produced long before airtime) was excised from all copies of the series when John F. Kennedy was assassinated so that it was never shown. This segment remains lost to this day.

The entire series is available on a DVD set from VCI Entertainment.

As of 2022, reruns of the show aired on Movies! channel every Saturday morning.

Guest stars 

The following were guest stars:

 Rose Marie           8-1-63
 Fabian  8-8-63
 Gypsy Rose Lee       8-15-63
 Allan Sherman        8-22-63
 Annette Funicello    8-29-63
 Edward Everett Horton9-5-63
 Paula Prentiss       9-12-63
 Sebastian Cabot      9-19-63
 Roddy McDowall       9-26-63
  Vivienne Della Chiesa 10-3-63
  Connie Stevens       10-10-63
  Rod Serling          10-17-63
  Connie Hines         10-24-63
  Cesar Romero         10-31-63
  Diana Dors           11-7-63
  Bullwinkle J. Moose  11-14-63
  Deborah Walley       11-21-63
  Paul Lynde           11-28-63
  Anna Maria Alberghetti12-5-63
  Ruta Lee             12-12-63
  Barbara Eden         12-19-63
  Bob Denver           12-26-63
  Pat Carroll           1-2-64
  Bob Newhart           1-9-64
  Ursula Andress        1-16-64
  Zsa Zsa Gabor         1-23-64
An interview with Johnny Weissmuller was filmed but not used; the interview with the Bullwinkle puppet may have been filmed as its replacement.  Co-producer Bill Scott (Bullwinkle's voice) appears briefly in two episodes, one as a delivery man and one as a stuntman.

See also
 Mad Movies with the L.A. Connection
 Mystery Science Theater 3000

External links
 

1963 American television series debuts
1964 American television series endings
1960s American satirical television series
American parody television series
Black-and-white American television shows
First-run syndicated television programs in the United States
Jay Ward Productions
Silent film
Television series by Desilu Productions